Jean-Claude Kazembe Musonda (17 May 1963 – 31 July 2021) was a Congolese politician.

Biography
He served as the first Governor of Haut-Katanga Province following the 2015 repartitioning.

References

1963 births
2021 deaths
Deaths from the COVID-19 pandemic in the Democratic Republic of the Congo
Governors of Haut-Katanga Province
Democratic Republic of the Congo politicians
People's Party for Reconstruction and Democracy politicians
People from Haut-Katanga Province
21st-century Democratic Republic of the Congo people